Ghansoli is a railway station on the Harbour line of the Mumbai Suburban Railway network. It is located on Thane–Belapur road in Sector-2 of Ghansoli node. 
The station is located in the vicinity of multiple business parks and office spaces, including the corporate headquarters of Reliance Industries Ltd. Ghansoli node comes under the jurisdiction of Rabale police station and adjoins Koparkhairane node towards the South, Airoli node towards the North and Dighe towards the East. Mangroves line the Western borders of Ghansoli.

This station is equipped with basic amenities like toilets, ticket counter only for local trains, ATVM, and coupon validating machines, CCTV surveillance, and special arrangement for disabled persons. Currently Ghansoli Station surrounding area is being upgraded for better parking facilities and other facilities for the travelers.

References 

Railway stations in Thane district
Mumbai Suburban Railway stations
Mumbai CR railway division